Relative Strangers is a British comedy television series which originally aired on Channel 4 between 14 January 1985 and 9 March 1987.

Main cast
 Mark Farmer as John
 Matthew Kelly as Fitz
 David Battley as Gerald
 Bernard Gallagher as Percy Fisher

References

Bibliography
 Vahimagi, Tise . British Television: An Illustrated Guide. Oxford University Press, 1996.

External links
 

1985 British television series debuts
1987 British television series endings
1980s British comedy television series
Channel 4 sitcoms
English-language television shows
Channel 4 original programming